The 1966 Polish Speedway season was the 1966 season of motorcycle speedway in Poland.

Individual

Polish Individual Speedway Championship
The 1966 Individual Speedway Polish Championship was held on 2 October at Rybnik.

Golden Helmet
The 1966 Golden Golden Helmet organised by the Polish Motor Union (PZM) was the 1966 event for the league's leading riders.

Calendar

Final classification

Silver Helmet
 winner - Zygfryd Friedek

Team

Team Speedway Polish Championship
The 1966 Team Speedway Polish Championship was the 19th edition of the Team Polish Championship. 

KS ROW Rybnik won the gold medal for the fifth consecutive season. The team included Joachim Maj, Antoni Woryna, Andrzej Wyglenda and Stanisław Tkocz.

First League

Second League

Two year tables
An additional award was given to the team that topped the league tables over a two year period.

First League 1965-66

Second League 1965-66

References

Poland Individual
Poland Team
Speedway
1966 in Polish speedway